The Emperor in Han Dynasty, also released under the title The Emperor Han Wu in some countries, is a 2005 Chinese historical drama television series based on the life of Emperor Wu of the Han dynasty. It uses the historical texts Records of the Grand Historian and Book of Han as its source material.

Plot
The series covers the life of Emperor Wu from his early childhood to his death and some events in the reign of Emperor Jing (Emperor Wu's father and predecessor), such as the Rebellion of the Seven States. It follows the conflicts that defined the pivotal war between the Han Empire and the Xiongnu, and depicts the major victories that the Han scored over the Xiongnu during Emperor Wu's reign. Prominent historical figures such as the generals Li Guang, Wei Qing and Huo Qubing, as well as the diplomats Su Wu and Zhang Qian, also make appearances as supporting characters in the series.

Cast
 Note: Some cast members played multiple roles. The roles are separated by a slash.

 Chen Baoguo as Emperor Wu
 Du Chun as older teenage Emperor Wu
 Bai Yu as younger teenage Emperor Wu
 Wan Changhao as child Emperor Wu
 Jiao Huang as Emperor Jing
 Gua Ah-leh as Empress Dowager Dou
 Song Xiaoying as Empress Wang
 Tao Hong as Liu Ling
 Lin Jing as Wei Zifu
 Wang Wang as Sima Qian
 Yang Tongshu as Princess Pingyang / Jin Su
 Ma Shaohua as Dou Ying
 Xu Zuming as Zhou Yafu
 Chang Shih as Tian Fen
 Guo Xiao'an as Guan Fu
 Shen Baoping as Liu Wu, Prince of Liang
 Sun Feihu as Han Anguo
 Su Xiaoming as Liu Piao
 Xu Hongna as Empress Chen
 Lu Jianmin as Wei Qing
 Yang Lixiao as Princess Linlü
 Zhu Yi as Chao Cuo
 Sun Jifeng as Liu Wu (Prince of Chu)
 Chen Weidong as Liu Rong
 Sanmao as young Liu Rong
 Zhao Xuelian as Princess Nangong
 Luoqin Yingge as young Princess Nangong
 Li Danjun as Chuntuo
 Jian Dan as Consort Su
 Liu Sha as Empress Bo
 Ma Yong as Han Yan
 Zhang Guoqing as Chen Jia
 Wang Yanjing as Su Ben
 Su Chongshan as Liu Pi (Prince of Wu)
 Chen Jinhui as Liu Ang (Prince of Jiaoxi) / Shi Qing
 Gao Fa as Ichise Chanyu
 Chen Changhai as Zhonghang Yue
 Li Le as Huo Qubing
 Zhao Shuijing as Liu Ju
 Zhang Jialiang as Liu Tong
 Li Shiji as Prince of Dongyue / Prince of Minyue
 Lu Ying as Han Tuidang
 Wang Jingyi as Qiuxiang
 Bo Hong as Queen of Yuezhi
 Yan Jie as Zhao Xin (Ahu'er) / Jumeng
 Mengmeng as Chun'er
 Lin Zi as Xiaoqing
 Zhou Yingping as Ling'er
 Wang Wei as Prefect of Yongxiang
 Zhu Xianmin as Jifu
 Lin Zhonghua as Chao Cuo's father
 Xu Ming as Luan Bu
 Lu Shuming as Li Guang
 Chen Youwang as Wei Wan
 Zhao Gang as Yuan Ang / King of Dong'ou
 Li Ping as Gongsun Gui
 Hu Miao as Qian'er
 Gao Yicheng as Su Qing
 Yang Jun as Yang Sheng
 Tong Zhongqi as Zhi Du
 Yang Yazhou as Zheng Huaiguo
 Bo Guanjun as Ji An
 Ren Zhong as Zhang Qian
 Jin Ming as Yuan Gusheng
 Cong Lin as Gongsun He
 Zhang Shan as Guo Jie
 Li Ping as Liu She
 Huang Wei as Huang Sheng
 Yang Jun as Xiongnu general
 Fu Xuan as Sang Hongyang
 Qin Fan as Zhi Buyi
 Liu Dianxin as Cheng Bushi
 Guo Xirui as Zhuang Qingdi
 Ren Wu as Wang Zang
 Cui Yugui as Gongsun Hong
 Daliehan as Right Xiongnu Prince
 Xiaobate as Left Xiongnu Prince
 Xue Xiaolong as Zhao Wan
 Zhang Jingdong as Liu Qian
 Fu Li as Princess Consort
 Yang Dawei as Dongfang Shuo
 Huang Wei as Yang Deyi
 Wan Cang as Chen Yuanliang / Ying Gao
 Shi Zhishan as Feng Lin
 Li Xiaoding as Luo Yushan
 Zhang Hongbin as Zhang Tang
 Zhu Weican as Wang Fei
 Zhang Jialiang as Zheng Dangshi
 Gao Tingting as Li Yan
 Erentuya as Zhang Qian's wife
 Jia Wei as Su Jian
 Hao Hanfeng as Zhang Cigong
 Chen Yu'er as Liu Qian's wife
 Ba Yin as Gunchen Chanyu
 Bilige as King of Baiyang
 Xiaobate as Marquis of Guishuangxi
 Hui Jianguo as Liu Pengzu (Prince of Zhao)
 Nuqian as Yimei
 Hasibate as King of Xiutu
 Zhang Chaoli as Sang Hongyang
 Zhang Lei as Huo Guang / Lei Bei
 Fan Binbin as young Huo Guang
 Xu Chong as Jin Midi
 Sun Xun as young Jin Midi
 Ren Wei as Liu Ju
 Gu Guangpeng as young Liu Ju
 Wang Yingqi as Li Guangli / Sima Wangcheng
 Shen Baoping as Liu Qumao
 Liang Wei as Su Wu
 Qi Jie as Yu Chang
 Ba Yin as Hu Yafu
 Qin Jiahua as Tian Qianqiu
 Xia Zhixiang as Zhang Ou
 Huang Wenguang as Tao Qing
 Sun Zhanxian as Feng Jing
 Xu Dengke as Zhou Gongzi
 Chen Dazhong as Dou Pengzu
 Lin Zhonghua as Xu Chang
 He Ming as Zhou's wife
 Yang Pingyou as Yan Zhu
 Liu Wei as Dong Zhongshu
 Chen Zhigang as Yu Dan
 Cheng Wenxuan as Princess Linlü
 Balazhu'er as Xiongnu sorcerer
 Huoercha as Right Xiongnu Prince
 Jin Song as Left Grand Viceroy
 Jia Mingling as Ning Cheng
 Lou Jicheng as Liu An
 Zhong Hanhao as Shen Gong
 Zhang Xuehao as Gongsun Ao
 Hou Xiangling as Zhu Fuyan / Di Shan
 Jiang Guoyin as Wang Hui
 Gao Fei as Gan Fu
 Xie Hui as Nie Yi, Su Wen
 Song Jianhua as Li Xi
 Jiang Jing as Dou's wife
 Wang Guangjun as Li Yannian
 Dong Yunbo as Zhang Qian's son
 Liu Zhenbao as Li Gan
 Sengge Renqin as King of Loufan
 Guo Wei as Li Ling / Xihou Jia
 Wang Weimin as Xihou Wu / Du Zhou
 Gu Weiwei as Tian Fen's wife
 Li Jiang as Wu Bei
 Xue Xilong as Liu Qi
 Liu Changshan as Chancellor of Dayuan
 Bo Lin as Zhao Ponu
 He Qi as King of Hunxie
 Zhao Wanyi as Lady Zhao
 Hao Gang as Jiang Chong / Liu De
 Na Zhidong as Zhang Sheng
 Sun Xinyu as Liu Fuling

Production and reception
The production cost for The Emperor in Han Dynasty ran high, with a budget of 50 million yuan, covering extensive battle scenes, period costumes, props and huge backdrops. The crew chose various scenic locations in China, such as Inner Mongolia, Hebei, Henan and Zhejiang, to capture the vast expanse of the Han Empire and its frontiers. The casting featured four different actors playing Emperor Wu at different stages of his life, with the lead actor Chen Baoguo receiving the most screen time portraying the emperor's adult years. The shooting of the series began in 2003 and coincided with the SARS outbreak, causing manpower shortage and delays in production. Post-production began in 2004 and marketing clips started to appear on television talk shows and the Internet later that year.

The series was aired on CCTV-1 on 2 January 2005 to great enthusiasm from audience. While some liberties were taken with historical details, The Emperor in Han Dynasty was generally well received by viewers as a faithful portrayal of history. The series was acclaimed and won the 2005 Flying Apsaras Award for Best Long Television Series, Best Director (Hu Mei) and Best Lead Actor (Chen Baoguo).

List of featured songs
 Zuihou De Qingsu (最后的倾诉; The Final Outpour), the opening theme song, performed by Han Lei.
 Dengdai (等待; Wait), the ending theme song, performed by Han Lei.
 Xinling Shui Guo De Difang (心灵睡过的地方; Places Where My Soul Rested Before) performed by Han Lei
 Qianbai Nian Hou Shei Hai Jide Shei (千百年后谁还记得谁; Centuries and Millenniums Later Who Still Remembers Who) performed by Han Lei

References

 Facts and flaws make up epic TV tales

External links
  The Emperor in Han Dynasty official page on CCTV website
  The Emperor in Han Dynasty on Sina.com

2005 Chinese television series debuts
Television series set in the Western Han dynasty
Mandarin-language television shows
China Central Television original programming
Chinese historical television series
Emperor Wu of Han